Pandariya is a town and nagar panchayat and development block in Kabirdham district in the Indian state of Chhattisgarh. This block is famous for the Dewanpatpar magnetic hill, 40 km north of Pandariya, which has an optical illusion of a gravity hill where vehicle seems to defy the gravity and roll up hill.

Geography
It has an average elevation of .It is situated at the maikal range mountains and is surrounded by lush green Dense forest and only river (half nadi) is located in this city which is the lifeline for farmers of near by villages that comes under pandaria block.
this town also have plenty of education institutions and a govt sugar factory to avail benefits to the farmers near by cause this place is known for its farming and sugar producing .

Demographics
 India census, Pandariya had a population of 16,165; 8,173 males and 7,992 females, giving a sex-ratio of 978. Pandariya had an average literacy rate of 70.28, whilst 16% of the population (2,577) were children 0–6.

Gravity hill optical illusion 

Dewanpatpar magnetic hill, sometimes also called Pandariya magnetic hill and Kawardha magnetic hill, near Dewanpatpar village on "State Highway SH5" 40 km north of Pandariya in Kabirdham district (formerly called Kawardha district) has an optical illusion of a gravity hill where vehicle seems to defy the gravity and roll from down slope to up the slope. It is 70 km north of Kawardha city on SH5, 130 km northwest of Bilaspur via NH130A, 260 km northwest of Raigarh, 280 km southwest of Ambikapur city, 110 km south of Shahdol, 210 km southeast of Jabalpur, 44 km south of Gadasarai near Chhattisgarh-Madhaya Pradesh border. Another nearest magnetic hill is 300 km away at Ulta pani at Mainpat hill station in Surguja district.

References

Cities and towns in Kabirdham

Gravity hills